This is a list of bacteria that are significant in medicine. It is not intended as an exhaustive list of all bacterial species: that should be at List of bacteria. For viruses, see list of viruses.



A 
Acetobacter aurantius
Acinetobacter baumannii
Actinomyces israelii
Agrobacterium radiobacter
Agrobacterium tumefaciens
Anaplasma
Anaplasma phagocytophilum
Azorhizobium caulinodans
Azotobacter vinelandii
viridans streptococci

B 
Bacillus
Bacillus anthracis
Bacillus brevis
Bacillus cereus
Bacillus fusiformis
Bacillus licheniformis
Bacillus megaterium
Bacillus mycoides
Bacillus stearothermophilus
Bacillus subtilis
Bacillus thuringiensis
Bacteroides
Bacteroides fragilis
Bacteroides gingivalis
Bacteroides melaninogenicus (now known as Prevotella melaninogenica)
Bartonella
Bartonella henselae
Bartonella quintana
Bordetella
Bordetella bronchiseptica
Bordetella pertussis
Borrelia burgdorferi
Brucella
Brucella abortus
Brucella melitensis
Brucella suis
Burkholderia
Burkholderia mallei
Burkholderia pseudomallei
Burkholderia cepacia

C 
Calymmatobacterium granulomatis
Campylobacter
Campylobacter coli
Campylobacter fetus
Campylobacter jejuni
Campylobacter pylori
Chlamydia
Chlamydia trachomatis
Chlamydophila
Chlamydophila pneumoniae (previously called Chlamydia pneumoniae)
Chlamydophila psittaci (previously called Chlamydia psittaci)
Clostridium
Clostridium botulinum
Clostridium difficile
Clostridium perfringens (previously called Clostridium welchii)
Clostridium tetani
Corynebacterium
Corynebacterium diphtheriae
Corynebacterium fusiforme

Coxiella burnetii

E 
Ehrlichia chaffeensis
Ehrlichia ewingii
Eikenella corrodens
Enterobacter cloacae
Enterococcus
Enterococcus avium
Enterococcus durans
Enterococcus faecalis
Enterococcus faecium
Enterococcus gallinarum
Enterococcus maloratus
Escherichia coli

F 
Fusobacterium necrophorum
Fusobacterium nucleatum

G 
Gardnerella vaginalis

H 
Haemophilus
Haemophilus ducreyi
Haemophilus influenzae
Haemophilus parainfluenzae
Haemophilus pertussis
Haemophilus vaginalis
Helicobacter pylori

K 
Klebsiella pneumoniae

L 
Lactobacillus
Lactobacillus acidophilus
Lactobacillus bulgaricus
Lactobacillus casei
Lactococcus lactis
Legionella pneumophila
Leptospira interrogans
Leptospira noguchii
Listeria monocytogenes

M 
Methanobacterium extroquens
Microbacterium multiforme
Micrococcus luteus
Moraxella catarrhalis
Mycobacterium
Mycobacterium avium
Mycobacterium bovis
Mycobacterium diphtheriae
Mycobacterium intracellulare
Mycobacterium leprae
Mycobacterium lepraemurium
Mycobacterium phlei
Mycobacterium smegmatis
Mycobacterium tuberculosis
Mycoplasma
Mycoplasma fermentans
Mycoplasma genitalium
Mycoplasma hominis
Mycoplasma penetrans
Mycoplasma pneumoniae
Mycoplasma mexican

N 
Neisseria
Neisseria gonorrhoeae
Neisseria meningitidis

P 
Pasteurella
Pasteurella multocida
Pasteurella tularensis
Peptostreptococcus
Porphyromonas gingivalis
Prevotella melaninogenica (previously called Bacteroides melaninogenicus)
Pseudomonas aeruginosa

R 
Rhizobium radiobacter
Rickettsia
Rickettsia prowazekii
Rickettsia psittaci
Rickettsia quintana
Rickettsia rickettsii
Rickettsia trachomae
Rochalimaea
Rochalimaea henselae
Rochalimaea quintana
Rothia dentocariosa

S 
Salmonella
Salmonella enteritidis
Salmonella typhi
Salmonella typhimurium
Serratia marcescens
Shigella dysenteriae
Spirillum volutans
Staphylococcus
Staphylococcus aureus
Staphylococcus epidermidis
Stenotrophomonas maltophilia
Streptococcus
Streptococcus agalactiae
Streptococcus avium
Streptococcus bovis
Streptococcus cricetus
Streptococcus faceium
Streptococcus faecalis
Streptococcus ferus
Streptococcus gallinarum
Streptococcus lactis
Streptococcus mitior
Streptococcus mitis
Streptococcus mutans
Streptococcus oralis
Streptococcus pneumoniae
Streptococcus pyogenes
Streptococcus rattus
Streptococcus salivarius
Streptococcus sanguis
Streptococcus sobrinus

T 
Treponema

 U Ureaplasma urealyticum V VibrioVibrio choleraeVibrio commaVibrio parahaemolyticusVibrio vulnificusWWolbachia Y YersiniaYersinia enterocoliticaYersinia pestisYersinia pseudotuberculosis''

See also
List of bacterial orders
List of bacteria genera
List of human diseases associated with infectious pathogens

Bacterial diseases
Bacteria and humans
Bacteria
Bacteria